The Eastern Samar State University is a state university in the Philippines with main campus located in Borongan, Eastern Samar. It has a satellite campus in Salcedo, Maydolong, Guiuan and Can-avid.

History
Founded On February 14, 1960 ( as the Eastern Samar National Regional Agricultural School – ESNRAS) through R.A. 2434. Some 120 Students held sessions in a rented building in Borongan. The school was later established in Malbog, far-flung barrio of Borongan, reach only by climbing steep mountains and by crossing creeks.

In 1967, the school was resettled to its present location between the Barangays of Tabunan and Maypangdan, some seven kilometers away from the provincial capital city of Borongan.

The school was converted into the Eastern Samar Junior Agricultural College (ESJAC) in 1973 to meet the clamor for the offering of the collegiate courses. ESJAC promptly opened a program in Associate in Agriculture and later Bachelor of Science in Agriculture (BSA) when it became Eastern Samar College of Agriculture (ESCA) in 1978.

ESCA was converted into the Eastern Samar State College (ESSC) by virtue of B.P 394 on May 18, 1993. This conversion eventually paved the way to rapid expansion in program offerings with courses in teacher education, vocational post-secondary education, business and commerce, engineering and law.

Republic Act 8292, enacted on June 6, 1997 mandated the CHED Supervised Higher Education Institutions of a province to integrate into a State College or a University (SUC) System. The following educational institutions Felipe Abrigo National memorial College of arts and Trade in Guiuan, Eastern Samar, Southern Samar College of Agriculture, Science and Technology in Salcedo, Eastern Samar and Can-avid National and Agriculture College in Can-avid, Eastern Samar were integrated into an educational system named Eastern Samar State College.

On August 7, 2004, R.A. 9312 was signed into law by President Gloria Macapagal Arroyo, converting ESSC into a University call Eastern Samar State University, which furthermore integrated the Maydolong National Agricultural School into the new University. Congressman Marcelino C. Libanan introduced the conversion bill in 2003 during the 12th congress, and Senator Francis N. Pangilinan sponsored it in the Senate.

General mandate
The University shall primarily provide advanced education, higher technology, professional instruction and training in the fields of industry computer and information technology, forestry, and environmental sciences, agricultural and veterinary medicine, fishery, medicine, and other related fields of study. It shall also promote research and extension services progressive leadership in the areas of specialization.

Curricular offerings
Curricular Offering of the Eastern Samar State University

Graduate School: Main Campus
- Master in Teaching Mathematics (non-thesis)
- Master of Arts in Teaching Mathematics (with thesis)
- Master in Secondary Education (non-thesis)
- Master of Arts in Secondary Education (with thesis)
- Master in Elementary Education (non-thesis)
- Master of Arts in Elementary Education (with thesis)
- Master in Filipino Language Teaching (non-thesis)
- Master in English Language Teaching (non-thesis)
- Master of Arts in English Language Teaching (with thesis)
- Master of Arts in Management (with thesis)
- Master in educational Management (non-thesis)
- Master of Arts in Educational Management (with thesis)
- Master in Agricultural Sciences (with thesis)
 Crop Science
 Animal Science

College of Engineering - Main Campus
- Bachelor Of Science in Civil Engineering
- Bachelor of Science in Electrical Engineering
- Bachelor of Science in Computer Engineering

College of Computer Studies - Main Campus
- Bachelor of Science in Computer Science
- Bachelor of Science in Information Technology
- Bachelor of Science in Information Systems

School of Vocational Technology
- Associate in Computer Science
- Electrical Technology
-  Trade Technical Education
 ::Drafting
 ::Automotive Technology
 ::Civil Technology

College of Education - Main Campus
- Bachelor Of Elementary Education
- Bachelor Of Secondary Education
	* Biological Science
	* Social Science
	* English
        * Filipino
        * Mathematics

College of Agriculture and Natural Science - Main Campus
- Bachelor of Science in Agricultural Management
- Bachelor of Science in Agriculture
	* Animal Science
College of Arts and Sciences - Main Campus
- Bachelor of Arts - Mass Communication
- Bachelor of Science in Biology
        * Biodiversity
- AB Political Science
- Bachelor of Science in Criminology

College of Nursing
- Bachelor of Science in Nursing

College of Business Management and Accountancy - Main Campus
- Bachelor of Science in Accountancy
- Bachelor of Science in Entrepreneurship
- Bachelor of Science in Business Administration
	* Business Economics
	* Human Resource Development Management
	* Financial Management
        * Marketing Management
College of Hospitality Management
- Bachelor of Science in Hotel Resort, Restaurant Management
- Bachelor of Science in Tourism

 Senior High School - Main Campus 
- Accountancy and Business Management (ABM)
,Science, Technology, Engineering and Mathematics (STEM)
,Humanities and Social Sciences (HUMSS)

- Technology Vocational Livelihood (TVL)
       * TVL - Information and Communication Technology (TVL - ICT)
       * TVL - Home Economics (TVL - HE)

Salcedo Campus
- Bachelor Of Elementary Education
- Bachelor Of Secondary Education
	* Mathematics
	* Physical Science
	* T. L. E.
- Bachelor Of Science In Agricultural Engineering
- Bachelor Of Science In Computer Science
- Bachelor Of Science In Agribusiness
	* Agribusiness Management
- Bachelor Of Science In Agriculture

Maydolong  Campus
- Bachelor Of Science Elementary Education
- Bachelor of Science Secondary Education
	* Social Science
	* Filipino
	* English
	* T.L.E.
- Bachelor of science in industrial technology
- Bachelor of science in civil engineering
- Bachelor of science in hotel, resort and restaurant management 
- Bachelor of science in tourism
	* Travel and tour management

Guiuan Campus
- Bachelor of secondary education
	* Social science
	* Mathematics
- Bachelor of  Elementary Education
- Bachelor of Agricultural Technology
- Bachelor of Science in Agriculture
	* Agro Forestry
	* Crop Science
- Bachelor of Science in Agriculture
- Associate in Computer Science

Can-avid Campus
- Bachelor of Science in Criminology
- Bachelor of Science in Industrial Technology
	* Food and Beverage Service Technology
	* Civil Technology
- Bachelor of Elementary Education
- Bachelor of Secondary Education
	* T.L.E.
	* MAPEH

Administration
 Officers
 University President
 Vice President for Academic Affairs
 Vice President for Administration
 Board of Regents
 Chairperson of the Commission on Higher Education as chairman of the Board
 University President as vice chairperson
 Chairperson of the Committee on Education, Arts and Culture of the Philippine Senate as member
 Chairperson of the Committee on Higher and Technical Education of the House of Representatives of the Philippines as member
 Regional Director of the National Economic and Development Authority as member
 Regional Director of the Department of Science and Technology as member
 President of the federation of faculty association of the University as member
 President of the federation of student councils of the University as member
 President of the federation of alumni associations of the University as member
 Two prominent citizens from the private sector who have distinguished themselves in their profession or fields of specialization as members

Satellite campuses
 Eastern Samar State University - Salcedo, Eastern Samar
 Eastern Samar State University - Can-Avid, Eastern Samar
 Eastern Samar State University (formerly Felipe Abrigo National Memorial College of Arts and Trades) - Guiuan, Eastern Samar
 Eastern Samar State University - Maydolong, Eastern Samar

References

 http://www.chanrobles.com/bataspambansa/bataspambansablg394.html
 http://www.chanrobles.com/republicactno9312.htm

State universities and colleges in the Philippines
Universities and colleges in Eastern Samar
Borongan